Samuel Salvador Ranzino (June 21, 1927 – March 13, 1994) was an American college and professional basketball player.  He was an All-American guard at North Carolina State University and played one season in the NBA with the Rochester Royals.

Ranzino starred at Emerson High School in Gary, Indiana and was recruited to NC State by coach Everett Case, who also hailed from Indiana.  Ranzino led the Wolfpack to four consecutive Southern Conference basketball titles and the school's first Final Four appearance in 1950.  Individually, Ranzino received All-American mention in 1950 and was a consensus first-team All-American in 1951.  Ranzino scored 1,967 points in his career, a mark that stood until 1975 when it was broken by David Thompson.  Ranzino's number 77 is honored by NC State and hangs in the rafters of the RBC Center.

After completing his college career, Ranzino was selected by the Rochester Royals in the first round (8th pick overall) of the 1951 NBA Draft.  He played one season for the Royals, averaging 2.2 points per game.

Sam Ranzino was elected to the North Carolina Sports Hall of Fame in 1982.

References

1927 births
1994 deaths
All-American college men's basketball players
American men's basketball players
Basketball players from Gary, Indiana
NC State Wolfpack men's basketball players
Rochester Royals draft picks
Rochester Royals players
Shooting guards